Ross Lewis (Bishopstown, 1965) is an Irish Michelin-star-winning head chef and co-owner of the restaurant Chapter One.

Lewis grew up on a farm and went on to study Dairy Science at University College Cork. He discovered cooking as a living while working on a student visa in the United States. He later went to London to learn the trade of a chef. Through a schoolmate he found a job at the restaurant Odin's, owned by Peter Langan. From there he went on to Dolphin Brasserie as junior manager and to Le Chat Botté Restaurant at the Beau Rivage Hotel in Geneva, Switzerland. He came back in Ireland in 1990 and some time later took the chance of taking over Chapter One in the Dublin Writers Museum. The restaurant started trading in 1992. 

Lewis also served three years (2001 – 2004) as Commissioner General of Eurotoques. Currently (2008-2011) he is a normal commissioner.

In 2011, he was the head chef for the State Banquet during the State Visit of queen Elizabeth II to Ireland.

Festivals
Ross Lewis claims to be a hands-on chef. This visible in his participation in festivals, giving lectures, demonstrations and workshops. To name a few:
 Taste of Dublin 2007-2011
 Front man for the first Taste of Cork Festival/EatCork Festival in 2008.
 Kinsale Food Festival 2008 
 Chef at EatCork 2010
 cookery demonstrations at Waterford Food Festival 2011
 Guest chef of Féile Bia na Mara 2011 (Achill Seafood Festival).

Personal
Ross Lewis is married and has three daughters. He lives in Seapoint.

Awards
 Michelin star 2007–present
 RAI Award 2009
 Good food award 2006

References

External links 
 YouTube clip with an interview with Ross Lewis

Irish chefs
Living people
1965 births
Head chefs of Michelin starred restaurants